Head of Christiana Presbyterian Church is a historic Presbyterian church and cemetery at 1100 Church Road in Newark, Delaware. It was built in 1859 and is a one-story, four bay gable roofed brick building.  Adjacent to the church is a four and a half acre church cemetery with burials dating back to the mid-18th century.  The church congregation was established in 1708 by Scotch-Irish immigrants.

It was added to the National Register of Historic Places in 1983.

References

External links
 Head of Christiana Presbyterian Church Official Church Website
 Official Head of Christiana Cemetery Website
 

Churches on the National Register of Historic Places in Delaware
Presbyterian churches in Delaware
Churches completed in 1859
19th-century Presbyterian church buildings in the United States
Buildings and structures in Newark, Delaware
Churches in New Castle County, Delaware
Irish-American culture in Delaware
Scotch-Irish American history
National Register of Historic Places in New Castle County, Delaware